The , also known as the , is a football stadium in Misaki Park, Hyogo-ku, Kobe, Japan. The stadium has a capacity of 30,132. This stadium, which features a retractable roof, is the home ground of J1 League club Vissel Kobe and the rugby union Japan Rugby League One team Kobelco Kobe Steelers.

In 1970,  was opened at the site of the Kobe Keirin Track.  It was the first football stadium in Japan to be able to host games at night following the installation of night lighting.

2002 FIFA World Cup
In order to host the 2002 FIFA World Cup, the stadium was renovated to install a removable roof and increase spectator capacity. It was opened under the name Kobe Wing Stadium in November 2001 with a capacity of 42,000.

Reopened in 2003 with a reduced capacity of 32,000 Kobe Wing Stadium became the home of the Vissel Kobe football club.

2019 Rugby World Cup
The stadium was announced as one of the venues for 2019 Rugby World Cup which will be the first Rugby World Cup to be held in Asia. Four group games were played in the stadium between the end of September and early October 2019.

Naming rights
In February 2007, Next Co., Ltd. (the owner of the real estate website "Home's") purchased the naming rights to the stadium from the city of Kobe for three years at a sum of 70 million yen per year. The stadium was renamed "Home's Stadium Kobe" on March 1, 2007, and the contract was renewed for a further three years in January 2010.

In 2012, the city of Kobe sought tenders for a new naming sponsor. Kobe-based cosmetics company Noevir was the only bidder, and in February 2013, the city announced the conclusion of a three-year contract for the sum of 65 million yen per year. The stadium became known as Noevir Stadium Kobe on 1 March 2013.

References

External links

  

Buildings and structures in Kobe
2002 FIFA World Cup stadiums in Japan
Football venues in Japan
Rugby union stadiums in Japan
Cricket grounds in Japan
Vissel Kobe
Retractable-roof stadiums in Japan
Sports venues in Hyōgo Prefecture
Tourist attractions in Kobe
Sport in Kobe
American football venues in Japan
2001 establishments in Japan
Sports venues completed in 2001